The Antidote is the fourth solo album by Boston, Massachusetts rapper Benzino, released August 21, 2007 on 7th Floor Music.

Background
The album's first single "Back On My Grizzy" is produced by Ty Fyffe (who also produced 50 Cent's lead single  "Straight to the Bank"). The Antidote also features production from such rap notables as Scott Storch, Hangmen 3, Stevie J, Rick Ross, Cognito, Gorilla Tek, TracKings,DJ KEVIS and Nacho Typical, and appearances by Stevie J and Ja Rule. A noticeable theme is that S is replaced by Z in most of the song titles.

Benzino's The Antidote introduces his new crew, made up of MC's from Miami, New York, and his hometown of Boston, collectively known as The 1st 48. The 1st 48 includes rappers One Monzta, Lil Dev, Picalo, Ballgrum, Cognito, Young LO, Young Hardy (Which LO and Hardy have previously been in the rap group, The Untouchables with Benzino) and 8Bus Columni. The album package includes the DVD "Countdown To Antidote," which allows fans to spend 3 days in real-time with Benzino and The 1st 48, and also includes 5 bonus music videos.

Track listing

References

External links
[ The Antidote] at Allmusic
The Antidote at Discogs

Benzino albums
2007 albums